The 1995 Nevada Wolf Pack football team represented the University of Nevada, Reno during the 1995 NCAA Division I-A football season. Nevada competed as a member of the Big West Conference (BWC). The Wolf Pack were led by Chris Ault in his 19th overall and 2nd straight season since taking over as head coach for the second time in 1994 and later resigned from coaching at the end of the season to retain his job as athletic director. They played their home games at Mackay Stadium.

Schedule

Roster

References

Nevada
Nevada Wolf Pack football seasons
Big West Conference football champion seasons
Nevada Wolf Pack football